Glösa is a locality in Alsen in the historical province Jämtland in the middle of Sweden. Glösa is situated in Krokom Municipality, 50 kilometres northwest of Östersund, the capital of Jämtland. Glösa is a village in an agricultural area and has a long history.

Petroglyphs in Glösa were made approximately 5 000 years ago. The carvings consist of moose and were first described in 1685.

Gallery

References
 Lofterud, Curt: Hällristningarna i Glösa. Alsens hembygdsförening.
 Alsen - en sockenbok. Alsen, 1982.
 Alsen - Näskott. Sevärt i Krokoms kommun 1. Nälden, 1986.

External links
 The Moose museum in Glösa (in Swedish) 
 Homepage of Alsen (in Swedish)

Populated places in Krokom Municipality
Jämtland
Archaeological sites in Sweden
Former Norwegian populated places